Corvallis Municipal Airport  is five miles southwest of Corvallis, in Benton County, Oregon. The National Plan of Integrated Airport Systems for 2011–2015 categorized it as a general aviation facility.

The airport offers full service and self serve fuel: 100LL and Jet A. Maintenance is available on the ramp; helicopter and fixed-wing flight instruction is available through Corvallis Aero Service.

History

The site was built during World War II by the United States Army Air Forces for bomber training as Corvallis Army Airfield. The original hangar is still in use.

Airline flights (West Coast DC-3s) began in 1947; successor Hughes Airwest pulled its F27s out in 1973.

Facilities
The airport covers 1,490 acres (603 ha) at an elevation of 250 feet (76 m). It has two asphalt runways: 17/35 is 5,900 by 150 feet (1,798 x 46 m) and 10/28 is 3,100 by 75 feet (945 x 23 m).

In the year ending February 18, 2010 the airport had 52,300 aircraft operations, average 143 per day: 97.5% general aviation, 1.5% military, and 1% air taxi. 153 aircraft were then based at the airport: 80% single-engine, 8% multi-engine, 1% jet, and 11% helicopter.

Airlines and destinations

Cargo

References

External links 
 Corvallis Municipal Airport at City of Corvallis website
 Corvallis Aero Service, the fixed-base operator (FBO)
 Oregon State Flying Club
 Aerial image as of May 1994 from USGS The National Map
 

Airports in Benton County, Oregon
Corvallis, Oregon